Tarsus City Stadium, is a football stadium in Tarsus in Mersin Province, Turkey. It is operated by Directorate of Mersin Youth Services and Sports.

It was completely renovated including the rebuilding of the covered stands. Tarsus İdman Yurdu football team play their home matches in the Tarsus City Stadium.

International events hosted
2013 Mediterranean Game
The stadium hosted nine out of 20 football matches played in 2013 Mediterranean Games between June 19 and 27.

2015 UEFA Women's Under-17 Championship qualification
From April 11 to 16, three of the six 2015 UEFA Women's Under-17 Championship qualification - Elite round Group 1 games were played in the stadium.

References

External links

Football venues in Turkey
Tarsus, Mersin
Sports venues in Mersin
2013 Mediterranean Games venues